USSP is a planned Submarine rescue ship of the Marina Militare, financed with 2017's balance law.
It is expected to replace Italian ship Anteo (A 5309).

Functions
USSP will be a multipurpose ship, thought to accomplish different missions:
 Submarine Rescue, through a deployable Submarine Rescue System (SRS), embarked on the stern portion of the weather deck. The ship is also fitted to host, as an alternative, either NATO Submarine Rescue System (NSRS) or US Navy SRDRS; DRASS Galeazzi SRV-650 is expected as SRS
 Diving Support, through an organic saturation system (SAT), located amidships, which includes two hyperbaric chambers (up to 6 persons each), one transfer under pressure (TUP) system, one hyperbaric boat (up to 16 persons), one working bell (300 m beneath the surface), operated through a dedicated moon-pool
 Hydro-Oceanographic activities, by means of specific sensor suite and hardware, including echo-sounder, Doppler log, Sub bottom profiler, Acoustic Doppler Current Profiler, etc.
 Navy Seals Support, by hosting and deploying special forces and relevant equipment.

History 
USSP program beginning on 2010 when parliamentary defence commission approved the act "Programma pluriennale di A/R n. SMD 02/2010, relativo all'acquisizione di un'unità navale di supporto subacqueo polivalente di ARS/NAI" (Multi-year program for multi-purpose Submarine support naval unit).
ARS/NAI vessel was fitted for a cost of € (EUR) 125 million, then updated to 300 and, finally, to 434 million Euros.

In June 2021 the contract was awarded to the Mariotti shipyard in Genoa.

Sensors 
 2 x High Precision Acoustic Positioning
 1 x Single Beam Echo-Sound
 3 x Multi Beam Echo-Sound
 3 x Side Scan Sonars
 1 x Sub Bottom Profiler
 1 x Underwater Telephone
 2 x Acoustic Doppler Current Profilers
 3 x Current Profilers
 1 x Wave Buoy
 1 x Gradiometer
 1 x Marine Magnetometer
 1 x Gravimeter System
 1 x Vibrocorer
 3 x Grab Samplers
 1 x Box Corer
 1 x Corer
 1 x CTD Sounder
 1 x Doppler Log
 1 x Expendable Bathythermograph

Deployable equipment 
 1 x McCann Rescue Chamber
 1 x Ventilation system for damaged
 1 x submarine control of depressurization included
 1 x ADS - Atmospheric diving suit
 1 x ROV Remotely Operated Vehicle working 
 1 x ROV watching 
 1 x ROV light working 
 1 x AUV Autonomous Underwater Vehicle

See also
 SRV-300
 COMSUBIN

References

External links
 Ships Marina Militare website

Submarine rescue ships
Proposed ships
Auxiliary ships of the Italian Navy
Ships built by Fincantieri
Ships built in La Spezia